Desireé Dallagiacomo is an American spoken word poet and teaching artist. She is of European and Choctaw descent, and she is an enrolled citizen of the Choctaw Nation of Oklahoma. Her first book of poetry, SINK, was published by Button Poetry in March 2019. Before publishing her first full-length collection, her poems amassed millions of views on Youtube. Her poems, "Thighs Say" “Real Sex Tips.” and “Shave Me” among others were first published by Button Poetry. She is a Pushcart Prize Nominee.

She founded the writing retreat The Heart of It.

Awards 

 2013 Southwest Shootout Regional Slam Champion 
 University of New Orleans recipient of the Ryan Chigazola Poetry Scholarship.
 2014 Individual National Poetry Slam ranked 3rd
 2014 National Poetry Slam, 3rd place with Slam New Orleans
 2014 Pushcart Prize nominee
 2015 Women Of the World Poetry Slam ranked 3rd
 2017 Brave New Voices International Poetry Slam Champion (Head Coach)

Selected performances 
 “Thighs Say,“ 2014 Individual World Poetry Slam Finals in Phoenix, Arizona
 "Shave Me," 2015 Women Of The World Poetry Slam 
 (with Kaycee Filson) "Real Sex Tips," 2014 National Poetry Slam 
 "Drop Off Lines"

Publications

Books 

 2012 The Year of the Institution, Next Left Press
 2014 Dimly Lit, Next Left Press
2019 Sink, Button Poetry

Early life 
Dallagiacomo is originally from Chico, California but moved to Baton Rouge, Louisiana in 2010.

References 

Year of birth missing (living people)
Living people
21st-century American poets
American spoken word poets
People from Chico, California